Lazo is a surname. Notable people with the surname include:

Alec Lazo, Cuban-American dancer, instructor, and choreographer
Agustín Lazo Adalid (1896–1971), Mexican artist and playwright
Pedro Luis Lazo (born 1973), Cuban baseball player
Ralph Lazo, American civil rights activist
Sergey Lazo (1894–1920), Moldovan revolutionary
William Lazo (1977), Cuban Professional Translator